Simon Morgan (born 5 September 1966) is an English former professional footballer who played as a defender for Fulham and Leicester City. He also represented England at Under 21 level, playing two matches in 1986.

Career
Morgan was born in Birmingham. He began his football career with Leicester City, representing them in the First and Second Divisions of The Football League, before being bought to then Third Division Fulham in October 1990 by Alan Dicks. The Cottagers finished 21st in Morgan's first season there (avoiding relegation by two points), and 9th in his second season (during which the club replaced Dicks with Don Mackay and missed out on the play-offs by four points) with a squad which Morgan felt "should have got promoted but for one reason or another we blew it". However, a 12th-placed finish in 1992–93 was followed by the club slipping to 18th with nine matches remaining of the 1993–94 season, as a result of which Mackay was replaced by Ray Lewington, and after going through these managerial changes, Fulham were relegated to the Third Division.

After finishing within three points of the play-offs in 1994–95 under Ian Branfoot, the club had slipped to 23rd by February 1996, and eventually appointed Micky Adams as manager, who helped them finish 17th. The team was promoted to the Second Division in 1997. The club was then bought by Mohamed Al Fayed, which was followed by Fulham's rise into the Premier League in 2001. Due to injury, Morgan only played once in Fulham's victorious 2000–01 Division One campaign, coming on as a substitute against Wolverhampton Wanderers, which earned him the Man of the Match award despite playing only 13 minutes.

Morgan was granted a testimonial year in the 2000–01 season. This included a special edition of Fulham fanzine TOOFIF, called "There's Only One Simon Morgan" (TOOSM), and culminated in a friendly match against Spurs, supported by a Fulham vs. Chelsea veterans' game (in which his son played). Morgan was unable to participate in the Spurs match due to injury, but kicked the match off before being shown a pre-arranged red card by referee Graham Poll.

Morgan then went to play at Brighton & Hove Albion for a season, scoring once against Northampton, before bringing his playing career to an end in 2002. After retiring he rejoined Fulham as head of the club's community scheme. He left the club in 2007 to become the Premier League's Head of Community Development.

References

External links

1966 births
Living people
Footballers from Birmingham, West Midlands
Association football defenders
English footballers
Leicester City F.C. players
Fulham F.C. players
Brighton & Hove Albion F.C. players
English Football League players
England under-21 international footballers